Christian Gouriéroux (born 1949) is an econometrician who holds a Doctor of Philosophy in mathematics from the University of Rouen. He has the Professor exceptional level title from France.  Gouriéroux is now a professor at University of Toronto and CREST, Paris [Center for
Research in Economics and Statistics].

Gouriéroux has published in journals worldwide, and was a recipient of the Koopmans Prize (with two fellow partners) for their project, "General Approach to Serial Correlation" in 1985–1987.  He was also awarded the Silver Medal of the Conseil National de Recherche Scientifique by the French Ministry of Research. He is a fellow of the Econometric Society.

Biography
Gouriéroux completed his undergraduate studies in economics and statistics at ENSAE. He has received Doctorat honoris causa from Université de Mons-Hainaut, Université de Neuchâtel, as well as HEC Montréal.

Works
Gouriéroux has written 17 books and over 160 articles, including 12 Econometrica. He his known for his work on the Quasi-maximum likelihood estimate  and Indirect inference 
Books

Articles/Essays/Papers

References

Christian S. Gouriéroux: IDEAS File
Global Investor Profile

French economists
Living people
Econometricians
1949 births
University of Rouen Normandy alumni
Fellows of the Econometric Society